The BioCatalogue is a curated catalogue of Life Science Web Services. The BioCatalogue was launched in June 2009 at the Intelligent Systems for Molecular Biology Conference. The project is a collaboration between the myGrid project at the University of Manchester led by Carole Goble and the European Bioinformatics Institute led by Rodrigo Lopez. It is funded by the Biotechnology and Biological Sciences Research Council.

The BioCatalogue is based on an open source Ruby on Rails codebase like its sister project, myExperiment.

References

Further reading
 Khalid Belhajjame, Carole Goble, Franck Tanoh, et al. Biocatalogue: A Curated Web Service Registry for the Life Science Community, Microsoft eScience conference 2008
 Goble CA and De Roure D Curating Scientific Web Services and Workflows EDUCAUSE Review
 BioCatalogue on Genomeweb
 BioCatalogue joins in the fight against cancer
 Curated catalogue of Web Services for the Life Science
 QuASAR: Quality Assurance of Semantic Annotations for Services

Bioinformatics organizations
Biological databases
Information technology organisations based in the United Kingdom
Department of Computer Science, University of Manchester
Science and technology in Greater Manchester